Rafe Stefanini is an old-time banjo player, fiddler, guitarist, singer, teacher, violin maker, and restorer.

He was born in San Benedetto Val di Sambro, Emilia-Romagna, northern Italy and grew up in Bologna. He first visited the United States in 1975,  and came to live in the U.S. in 1983. He became a U.S. citizen, and lived for many years in Elkins Park, Pennsylvania, a suburb of Philadelphia, before relocating to Madison, a neighborhood of Nashville, Tennessee, in July 2021. In addition to playing music, he is also trained in violin making and restores violins.

He has performed with the Wildcats (along with Carol Elizabeth Jones and Stefan Senders. Along with Dirk Powell and Bruce Molsky he has performed with a trio called the L-7s. He has also performed with Molsky and guitarist Beverly Smith in a group called Big Hoedown, a group that disbanded in 2000. Along with Meredith McIntosh, John Hermann, and Bev Smith, he has performed in the Rockinghams. He has also recorded with Bob Herring. He performs with his wife Nikki Lee (who plays guitar) and daughter Clelia (who plays fiddle, guitar, double bass, and ukulele) as "Nine Pound Hammer." Together, the three make up the Stefanini Family Band.

He has recorded for the Rounder, County, Marimac, Heritage, Yodel-ay-hee, 5-String Productions, and World Music Network labels.

Stefanini has performed on A Prairie Home Companion and at the Mount Airy Fiddlers Convention. He has performed throughout the United States as well as in Finland, Germany, Singapore, Thailand, Indonesia, Malaysia, and Brunei.

His brothers Gianni and Bruno also play old-time music and the three performed in The Moonshine Brothers, which formed in the late 1970s and remained together until Stefanini moved to the U.S. in 1983.

Discography

As leader
1999 - Hell and Scissors (County)
2001 - Glory on the Big String (County)
2006 - Bluegrass Meadows (5-String)
2006 - Ladies Fancy (County)

With Bob Herring
1995 - Old Paint (Yodel-ay-hee)
2004 - Fresh Coat (5-String)

With Bruce Molsky & Big Hoedown
1997 - Bruce Molsky & Big Hoedown (Rounder)

With Clelia Stefanini
2009 - Never Seen the Like...

With The Wildcats
Old Time Music (Marimac)
On Our Knees (Yodel-ay-hee)

Compilations
Galax International (Heritage)
5th Annual Galax Fiddlers Convention 1985 (Heritage)
2002 - Rough Guide to the Music of the Appalachians (World Music Network)
2003 - The Art Of Old-Time Mountain Music (Rounder)

Other
The Rockinghams (Yodel-ay-hee)
Shout Lulu (with The Rockinghams)
Old Time Friends (with Ray Alden and others) (Marimac)
The Young Fogies (Heritage)
Mike Seeger's 3rd Annual Farewell Reunion (with Mike Seeger and others; 1995 Grammy nominee) (Rounder)
A Tribute to the Appalachian String Band Music Festival (with The L7s) (Chubby Dragon)
The Marimac Anthology (Rounder)
Young Fogies Vol. 2 (with The L7s) (Rounder)
Red Prairie Dawn (with Gary Harrison & The Mule Team) (Gary Harrison)
''The Immigrant Band (with John Doyle, Eamon O'Leary, John Herrman, and Clelia Stefanini

References

External links

Official site
MySpace page
[ Allmusic entry]
Rafe & Clelia Stefanini MySpace page

Videos
Video documentary from the Pennsylvania Cable Network (August 30, 2015)

Banjoists
Appalachian old-time fiddlers
Italian musical instrument makers
Italian guitarists
Italian male guitarists
Italian male singers
Living people
Musicians from Bologna
Old-time musicians
People from Montgomery County, Pennsylvania
1950s births
Italian emigrants to the United States
Singers from Nashville, Tennessee
People from the Province of Bologna